Ian Edmund Andrews (born 1 December 1964, in Nottingham) is an English former footballer who played as a goalkeeper in the Football League for Leicester City, Swindon Town, Leeds United, Southampton and AFC Bournemouth, and in the Scottish Premier Division for Celtic. He was capped by England at under-21 level. His last appearance in the League was for Bournemouth in 1996, but while working for Leicester City as goalkeeping coach and physiotherapist, he was an unused substitute as late as the 2001–02 season. In 2004, he joined TeamBath as physiotherapist.

He is an alumnus of Manchester Metropolitan University

Career statistics

References

External links

1964 births
Living people
Footballers from Nottingham
English footballers
Association football goalkeepers
England under-21 international footballers
Mansfield Town F.C. players
Leicester City F.C. players
Swindon Town F.C. players
Celtic F.C. players
Leeds United F.C. players
Southampton F.C. players
AFC Bournemouth players
English Football League players
Scottish Football League players
Premier League players
Association football physiotherapists
Alumni of Manchester Metropolitan University
England youth international footballers
Leicester City F.C. non-playing staff